Innisfail was a provincial electoral district in Alberta, Canada, mandated to return a single member to the Legislative Assembly of Alberta from 1905 to 1940 and again from 1971 to 1993.

History
Innisfail was one of the original 25 electoral districts contested in the 1905 Alberta general election upon Alberta joining Confederation in September 1905. The electoral district was a continuation of the Innisfail Northwest Territories electoral district which was formed in 1902. The electoral district was named for the Town of Innisfail in central Alberta.

The first Member of the Legislative Assembly for Innisfail was John A. Simpson who had been originally elected in the 1902 Northwest Territories general election to the Innisfail seat in the 5th North-West Legislative Assembly prior to Confederation of Alberta.

Prior to the 1940 Alberta general election Innisfail was split between Rocky Mountain House and Red Deer electoral districts. However Innisfail would be re-formed in the 1970 electoral district re-distribution.

Innisfail was dissolved again in the 1993 electoral district redistribution to form the Innisfail-Sylvan Lake electoral district.

Members of the Legislative Assembly (MLAs)

Election results

1905 Alberta general election

1909 Alberta general election

1913 Alberta general election

1917 Alberta general election

1921 Alberta general election

1926 Alberta general election

|-
| colspan="6" align ="center"|First count

|-
| colspan="6" align ="center"|Ballot transfer results

1930 Alberta general election

|-
| colspan="6" align ="center"|First count

|-
| colspan="6" align ="center"|Ballot transfer results

1935 Alberta general election

1971 Alberta general election

1975 Alberta general election

1979 Alberta general election

1982 Alberta general election

1986 Alberta general election

1989 Alberta general election

See also
List of Alberta provincial electoral districts
Innisfail, a town in central Alberta

References

Further reading

External links
Elections Alberta
The Legislative Assembly of Alberta

Former provincial electoral districts of Alberta